Musa Gurbanov (born 9 November 1964) is Azerbaijani former professional footballer who played as a forward. He is the all time topscorer of the Azerbaijan Premier League. He obtained two caps for the national team in 1992–1993.

Career statistics

International

Honours

Individual
Azerbaijan Premier League Top Scorer (1): 1993–94

Personal life
Musa is the brother of Azerbaijani football manager and former footballer Gurban Gurbanov.

References

External links
 
 Профиль на сайте FootballFacts.ru
 Профиль игрока на сайте www.scoresway.com
 Профиль игрока на сайте www.soccerpunter.com

Living people
1964 births
People from Zaqatala
Azerbaijani footballers
Soviet footballers
Azerbaijan international footballers
Association football forwards
Turan-Tovuz IK players
FK Energetik players
Kapaz PFK players
Qarabağ FK players
Neftçi PFK players
FC Baku players
Azerbaijani football managers